The 2010–11 Philadelphia 76ers season is the 72nd season of the franchise, 62nd in the National Basketball Association (NBA), and the 48th in Philadelphia.

The Sixers 41–41 record earned them 7th in the Eastern Conference. In the playoffs, they lost to the eventual Eastern Conference champion Miami Heat, who added LeBron James and Chris Bosh to join Dwyane Wade, in the first round in five games.

Key Dates
 May 21 – NBA on TNT broadcaster Doug Collins was named as head coach of the Philadelphia 76ers.
 June 17 – The Sixers traded center Samuel Dalembert to the Sacramento Kings in exchange for forward Andrés Nocioni and center Spencer Hawes.
 June 24 – The NBA Draft was held in New York City.
 July 1 – The free agency period started.

Offseason

Draft picks

Roster

Pre-season

Game log

|- bgcolor="#ffcccc"
| 1
| October 5
| New Jersey
| 
| Marreese Speights (19)
| Marreese Speights (9)
| Jrue Holiday (4)
| Roanoke Civic Center4,114
| 0–1
|- bgcolor="#ffcccc"
| 2
| October 6
| @ Boston
| 
| Thaddeus Young (17)
| Jrue Holiday (6)
| Thaddeus Young,Marreese Speights,Lou Williams (2)
| Verizon Wireless Arena10,038
| 0–2
|- bgcolor="#ffcccc"
| 3
| October 9
| @ New Jersey
| 
| Andre Iguodala (20)
| Elton Brand (11)
| Evan Turner (7)
| Prudential Center6,252
| 0–3
|- bgcolor="#ccffcc"
| 4
| October 12
| Boston
| 
| Marreese Speights (19)
| Jrue Holiday (7)
| Jrue Holiday (7)
| Wells Fargo Center7,835
| 1–3
|- bgcolor="#ffcccc"
| 5
| October 13
| @ Toronto
| 
| Jrue Holiday (18)
| Evan Turner (12)
| Jrue Holiday (12)
| Air Canada Centre12,078
| 1–4
|- bgcolor="#ffcccc"
| 6
| October 19
| @ Cleveland
| 
| Andre Iguodala (19)
| Andre Iguodala (10)
| Andre Iguodala,Evan Turner (6)
| U.S. Bank Arena6,217
| 1–5
|- bgcolor="#ccffcc"
| 7
| October 20
| New York
| 
| Andre Iguodala,Jason Kapono (20)
| Elton Brand (11)
| Jrue Holiday (11)
| Wells Fargo Center6,473
| 2–5
|-

Regular season

Standings

Record vs. opponents

Game log

|- bgcolor="#ffcccc"
| 1
| October 27
| Miami
| 
| Evan Turner (16)
| Elton Brand (9)
| Louis Williams (7)
| Wells Fargo Center20,389
| 0–1
|- bgcolor="#ffcccc"
| 2
| October 29    
| Atlanta
| 
| Andre Iguodala (27)
| Elton Brand (8)
| Andre Iguodala (10)
| Wells Fargo Center10,960
| 0–2
|- bgcolor="#ffcccc"
| 3
| October 30
| @ Indiana
| 
| Louis Williams (18)
| Elton Brand (10)
| Andre Iguodala,Evan Turner (3)
| Conseco Fieldhouse18,165
| 0–3
|-

|- bgcolor="#ffcccc"
| 4
| November 2
| @ Washington
| 
| Louis Williams (30)
| Elton Brand (9)
| Jrue Holiday (13)
| Verizon Center17,803
| 0–4
|- bgcolor="#ccffcc"
| 5
| November 3
| Indiana
| 
| Elton Brand (25)
| Elton Brand (12)
| Jrue Holiday (5)
| Wells Fargo Center12,277
| 1–4
|- bgcolor="#ffcccc"
| 6
| November 5
| Cleveland
| 
| Jrue Holiday (29)
| Tony Battie (7)
| Jrue Holiday (8)
| Wells Fargo Center10,589
| 1–5
|- bgcolor="#ccffcc"
| 7
| November 7
| @ New York
| 
| Elton Brand (20)
| Evan Turner (10)
| Jrue Holiday (8)
| Madison Square Garden18,735
| 2–5
|- bgcolor="#ffcccc"
| 8
| November 10
| @ Oklahoma City
| 
| Elton Brand,Jrue Holiday,Jodie Meeks (17)
| Elton Brand (9)
| Jrue Holiday (11)
| Oklahoma City Arena18,203
| 2–6
|- bgcolor="#ffcccc"
| 9
| November 12
| @ Dallas
| 
| Thaddeus Young (17)
| Elton Brand (9)
| Jrue Holiday (13)
| American Airlines Center19,989
| 2–7
|- bgcolor="#ffcccc"
| 10
| November 13
| @ San Antonio
| 
| Jrue Holiday (16)
| Andre Iguodala (8)
| Jrue Holiday (5)
| AT&T Center17,627
| 2–8
|- bgcolor="#ffcccc"
| 11
| November 16
| @ Cleveland
| 
| Thaddeus Young (17)
| Elton Brand (11)
| Jrue Holiday (10)
| Quicken Loans Arena20,562
| 2–9
|- bgcolor="#ffcccc"
| 12
| November 17
| Toronto
| 
| Elton Brand (27)
| Evan Turner (12)
| Jrue Holiday (7)
| Wells Fargo Center12,164
| 2–10
|- bgcolor="#ccffcc"
| 13
| November 19
| Milwaukee
| 
| Thaddeus Young (23)
| Marreese Speights (10)
| Evan Turner (6)
| Wells Fargo Center14,557
| 3–10
|- bgcolor="#ffcccc"
| 14
| November 23
| @ Washington
| 
| Andre Iguodala (23)
| Andre Iguodala (11)
| Andre Iguodala (8)
| Verizon Center16,197
| 3–11
|- bgcolor="#ffcccc"
| 15
| November 24
| @ Toronto
| 
| Andre Iguodala (17)
| Andre Iguodala (8)
| Andre Iguodala,Jrue Holiday (6)
| Air Canada Centre15,012
| 3–12
|- bgcolor="#ffcccc"
| 16
| November 26
| @ Miami
| 
| Jodie Meeks (21)
| Andre Iguodala (9)
| Jrue Holiday (6)
| American Airlines Arena19,800
| 3–13
|- bgcolor="#ccffcc"
| 17
| November 27
| New Jersey
| 
| Jrue Holiday (20)
| Elton Brand (10)
| Jrue Holiday (13)
| Wells Fargo Center14,150
| 4–13
|- bgcolor="#ccffcc"
| 18
| November 30
| Portland
| 
| Elton Brand (18)
| Andre Iguodala,Thaddeus Young (7)
| Louis Williams (5)
| Wells Fargo Center13,556
| 5–13
|-

|- bgcolor="#ffcccc"
| 19
| December 3
| @ Atlanta
| 
| Elton Brand (16)
| Elton Brand (14)
| Andre Iguodala (8)
| Philips Arena12,140
| 5–14
|- bgcolor="#ccffcc"
| 20
| December 4
| Charlotte
| 
| Jodie Meeks (26)
| Elton Brand (10)
| Jrue Holiday,Andre Iguodala (7)
| Wells Fargo Center14,611
| 6–14
|- bgcolor="#ccffcc"
| 21
| December 7
| Cleveland
| 
| Thaddeus Young (26)
| Spencer Hawes (12)
| Jrue Holiday,Andre Iguodala (7)
| Wells Fargo Center10,662
| 7–14
|- bgcolor="#ffcccc"
| 22
| December 9
| Boston
| 
| Jodie Meeks (19)
| Elton Brand (14)
| Andre Iguodala (11)
| Wells Fargo Center17,948
| 7–15
|- bgcolor="#ccffcc"
| 23
| December 12
| New Orleans
| 
| Louis Williams (17)
| Elton Brand (13)
| Andre Iguodala,Louis Williams (5)
| Wells Fargo Center13,884
| 8–15
|- bgcolor="#ccffcc"
| 24
| December 14
| @ New Jersey
| 
| Jrue Holiday (19)
| Evan Turner (6)
| Jrue Holiday (5)
| Prudential Center10,151
| 9–15
|- bgcolor="#ccffcc"
| 25
| December 15
| L.A. Clippers
| 
| Jrue Holiday (24)
| Spencer Hawes (12)
| Jrue Holiday,Andre Iguodala (5)
| Wells Fargo Center11,775
| 10–15
|- bgcolor="#ffcccc"
| 26
| December 17
| L.A. Lakers
| 
| Spencer Hawes,Andre Iguodala (18)
| Spencer Hawes (13)
| Jrue Holiday,Andre Iguodala (6)
| Wells Fargo Center20,366
| 10–16
|- bgcolor="#ccffcc"
| 27
| December 18
| @ Orlando
| 
| Louis Williams (24)
| Elton Brand (13)
| Andre Iguodala (7)
| Amway Center18,846
| 11–16
|- bgcolor="#ffcccc"
| 28
| December 21
| @ Chicago
| 
| Andre Iguodala (17)
| Elton Brand (9)
| Louis Williams (4)
| United Center21,521
| 11–17
|- bgcolor="#ffcccc"
| 29
| December 22
| @ Boston
| 
| Elton Brand (16)
| Elton Brand (12)
| Jrue Holiday (5)
| TD Garden18,624
| 11–18
|- bgcolor="#ccffcc"
| 30
| December 26
| @ Denver
| 
| Jrue Holiday (22)
| Elton Brand (17)
| Andre Iguodala (5)
| Pepsi Center19,155
| 12–18
|- bgcolor="#ffcccc"
| 31
| December 27
| @ Golden State
| 
| Jrue Holiday (23)
| Elton Brand (16)
| Jrue Holiday (11)
| Oracle Arena19,208
| 12–19
|- bgcolor="#ccffcc"
| 32
| December 29
| @ Phoenix
| 
| Jrue Holiday (25)
| Andrés Nocioni (12)
| Jrue Holiday (7)
| US Airways Center18,422
| 13–19
|- bgcolor="#ffcccc"
| 33
| December 31
| @ L.A. Lakers
| 
| Jrue Holiday (19)
| Andrés Nocioni (8)
| Jrue Holiday (11)
| Staples Center18,997
| 13–20
|-

|- bgcolor="#ffcccc"
| 34
| January 3
| @ New Orleans
| 
| Elton Brand (14)
| Elton Brand (10)
| Jrue Holiday (6)
| New Orleans Arena13,433
| 13–21
|- bgcolor="#ccffcc"
| 35
| January 5
| Washington
| 
| Jrue Holiday,Louis Williams (26)
| Andrés Nocioni (10)
| Jrue Holiday (9)
| Wells Fargo Center12,434
| 14–21
|- bgcolor="#ccffcc"
| 36
| January 7
| Chicago
| 
| Jodie Meeks (24)
| Elton Brand,Spencer Hawes (8)
| Jrue Holiday (6)
| Wells Fargo Center15,303
| 15–21
|- bgcolor="#ffcccc"
| 37
| January 8
| @ Detroit
| 
| Evan Turner (19)
| Elton Brand (14)
| Jrue Holiday (12)
| The Palace of Auburn Hills20,038
| 15–22
|- bgcolor="#ffcccc"
| 38
| January 11
| Indiana
| 
| Jrue Holiday (19)
| Marreese Speights (9)
| Jrue Holiday (8)
| Wells Fargo Center10,890
| 15–23
|- bgcolor="#ccffcc"
| 39
| January 14
| Milwaukee
| 
| Louis Williams (25)
| Andre Iguodala (6)
| Andre Iguodala (7)
| Wells Fargo Center12,650
| 16–23
|- bgcolor="#ccffcc"
| 40
| January 17
| Charlotte
| 
| Louis Williams (23)
| Elton Brand (13)
| Jrue Holiday,Andre Iguodala (6)
| Wells Fargo Center13,508
| 17–23
|- bgcolor="#ffcccc"
| 41
| January 19
| @ Orlando
| 
| Louis Williams (19)
| Jrue Holiday,Evan Turner (8)
| Jrue Holiday,Andre Iguodala (6)
| Amway Center18,846
| 17–24
|- bgcolor="#ffcccc"
| 42
| January 20
| @ Charlotte
| 
| Thaddeus Young (21)
| Elton Brand (10)
| Jrue Holiday (7)
| Time Warner Cable Arena14,326
| 17–25
|- bgcolor="#ccffcc"
| 43
| January 22
| Utah
| 
| Andre Iguodala (22)
| Spencer Hawes (11)
| Andre Iguodala (5)
| Wells Fargo Center14,036
| 18–25
|- bgcolor="#ccffcc"
| 44
| January 24
| Phoenix
| 
| Thaddeus Young (24)
| Elton Brand (9)
| Jrue Holiday (8)
| Wells Fargo Center14,881
| 19–25
|- bgcolor="#ccffcc"
| 45
| January 26
| @ Toronto
| 
| Marreese Speights (23)
| Marreese Speights (9)
| Jrue Holiday (11)
| Air Canada Centre14,552
| 20–25
|- bgcolor="#ffcccc"
| 46
| January 28
| Memphis
| 
| Jrue Holiday,Jodie Meeks (16)
| Elton Brand (9)
| Andre Iguodala (9)
| Wells Fargo Center14,289
| 20–26
|- bgcolor="#ccffcc"
| 47
| January 30
| Denver
| 
| Andre Iguodala (24)
| Evan Turner (8)
| Jrue Holiday,Andre Iguodala (7)
| Wells Fargo Center15,612
| 21–26
|-

|- bgcolor="#ccffcc"
| 48
| February 2
| @ New Jersey
| 
| Louis Williams (26)
| Spencer Hawes (12)
| Jrue Holiday (11)
| Prudential Center10,057
| 22–26
|- bgcolor="#ccffcc"
| 49
| February 4
| New York
| 
| Elton Brand (33)
| Elton Brand (16)
| Andre Iguodala (16)
| Wells Fargo Center18,823
| 23–26
|- bgcolor="#ffcccc"
| 50
| February 6
| @ New York
| 
| Elton Brand (28)
| Elton Brand,Spencer Hawes,Andre Iguodala,Thaddeus Young (5)
| Andre Iguodala (8)
| Madison Square Garden19,763
| 23–27
|- bgcolor="#ccffcc"
| 51
| February 8
| @ Atlanta
| 
| Louis Williams (20)
| Jodie Meeks,Evan Turner,Thaddeus Young (8)
| Andre Iguodala (8)
| Philips Arena12,903
| 24–27
|- bgcolor="#ffcccc"
| 52
| February 9
| Orlando
| 
| Louis Williams (23)
| Spencer Hawes (10)
| Andre Iguodala (8)
| Wells Fargo Center12,091
| 24–28
|- bgcolor="#ccffcc"
| 53
| February 11
| San Antonio
| 
| Jrue Holiday (27)
| Elton Brand (17)
| Andre Iguodala (6)
| Wells Fargo Center15,501
| 25–28
|- bgcolor="#ccffcc"
| 54
| February 12
| @ Minnesota
| 
| Thaddeus Young (18)
| Elton Brand (9)
| Andre Iguodala (7)
| Target Center17,011
| 26–28
|- bgcolor="#ffcccc"
| 55
| February 15
| @ Memphis
| 
| Thaddeus Young (23)
| Elton Brand,Spencer Hawes (8)
| Jrue Holiday (5)
| FedExForum11,197
| 26–29
|- bgcolor="#ccffcc"
| 56
| February 16
| @ Houston
| 
| Jrue Holiday (20)
| Andre Iguodala (12)
| Andre Iguodala (10)
| Toyota Center14,476
| 27–29
|- align="center"
|colspan="9" bgcolor="#bbcaff"|All-Star Break
|- bgcolor="#ccffcc"
| 57
| February 23
| Washington
| 
| Jrue Holiday (20)
| Thaddeus Young (10)
| Louis Williams (7)
| Wells Fargo Center12,704
| 28–29
|- bgcolor="#ccffcc"
| 58
| February 25
| Detroit
| 
| Thaddeus Young (24)
| Elton Brand (17)
| Andre Iguodala (11)
| Wells Fargo Center15,105
| 29–29
|- bgcolor="#ccffcc"
| 59
| February 27
| @ Cleveland
| 
| Elton Brand,Louis Williams (16)
| Elton Brand (8)
| Jrue Holiday (9)
| Quicken Loans Arena19,882
| 30–29
|-

|- bgcolor="#ffcccc"
| 60
| March 1
| Dallas
| 
| Jodie Meeks (16)
| Jrue Holiday,Andre Iguodala,Thaddeus Young (7)
| Jrue Holiday (6)
| Wells Fargo Center13,509
| 30–30
|- bgcolor="#ccffcc"
| 61
| March 4
| Minnesota
| 
| Andre Iguodala (22)
| Andre Iguodala (10)
| Andre Iguodala (13)
| Wells Fargo Center12,008
| 31–30
|- bgcolor="#ccffcc"
| 62
| March 6
| Golden State
| 
| Evan Turner,Thaddeus Young (20)
| Andre Iguodala (11)
| Andre Iguodala (10)
| Wells Fargo Center11,294
| 32–30
|- bgcolor="#ccffcc"
| 63
| March 8
| @ Indiana
| 
| Thaddeus Young (18)
| Thaddeus Young (9)
| Andre Iguodala (10)
| Conseco Fieldhouse9,466
| 33–30
|- bgcolor="#ffcccc"
| 64
| March 9
| Oklahoma City
| 
| Jrue Holiday,Louis Williams (22)
| Elton Brand (15)
| Jrue Holiday,Andre Iguodala (8)
| Wells Fargo Center19,283
| 33–31
|- bgcolor="#ccffcc"
| 65
| March 11
| Boston
| 
| Elton Brand,Spencer Hawes (14)
| Spencer Hawes (10)
| Andre Iguodala (8)
| Wells Fargo Center20,614
| 34–31
|- bgcolor="#ffcccc"
| 66
| March 12
| @ Milwaukee
| 
| Louis Williams (16)
| Spencer Hawes (7)
| Andre Iguodala (5)
| Bradley Center15,832
| 34–32
|- bgcolor="#ffcccc"
| 67
| March 14
| @ Utah
| 
| Andre Iguodala (23)
| Spencer Hawes (10)
| Andre Iguodala (6)
| EnergySolutions Arena19,632
| 34–33
|- bgcolor="#ccffcc"
| 68
| March 16
| @ L.A. Clippers
| 
| Jodie Meeks (22)
| Elton Brand (12)
| Jrue Holiday (9)
| Staples Center19,060
| 35–33
|- bgcolor="#ccffcc"
| 69
| March 18
| @ Sacramento
| 
| Jrue Holiday (15)
| Thaddeus Young (10)
| Andre Iguodala (9)
| Power Balance Pavilion15,373
| 36–33
|- bgcolor="#ffcccc"
| 70
| March 19
| @ Portland
| 
| Louis Williams (24)
| Elton Brand (9)
| Jrue Holiday (10)
| Rose Garden20,637
| 36–34
|- bgcolor="#ccffcc"
| 71
| March 23
| Atlanta
| 
| Louis Williams (17)
| Elton Brand (11)
| Jrue Holiday (5)
| Wells Fargo Center15,199
| 37–34
|- bgcolor="#ffcccc"
| 72
| March 25
| @ Miami
| 
| Louis Williams (24)
| Elton Brand,Thaddeus Young (8)
| Jrue Holiday (6)
| American Airlines Arena19,840
| 37–35
|- bgcolor="#ffcccc"
| 73
| March 27
| Sacramento
| 
| Jrue Holiday (28)
| Elton Brand (15)
| Jrue Holiday (7)
| Wells Fargo Center16,235
| 37–36
|- bgcolor="#ccffcc"
| 74
| March 28
| @ Chicago
| 
| Thaddeus Young (21)
| Elton Brand (9)
| Andre Iguodala,Louis Williams (7)
| United Center22,210
| 38–36
|- bgcolor="#ccffcc"
| 75
| March 30
| Houston
| 
| Jrue Holiday (24)
| Thaddeus Young (9)
| Jrue Holiday (12)
| Wells Fargo Center16,635
| 39–36
|-

|- bgcolor="#ccffcc"
| 76
| April 1
| New Jersey
| 
| Thaddeus Young (22)
| Spencer Hawes (9)
| Jrue Holiday,Andre Iguodala (7)
| Wells Fargo Center16,695
| 40–36
|- bgcolor="#ffcccc"
| 77
| April 2
| @ Milwaukee
| 
| Elton Brand (20)
| Elton Brand (12)
| Jrue Holiday (10)
| Bradley Center17,079
| 40–37
|- bgcolor="#ffcccc"
| 78
| April 5
| @ Boston
| 
| Evan Turner (21)
| Spencer Hawes (8)
| Evan Turner (5)
| TD Garden18,624
| 40–38
|- bgcolor="#ffcccc"
| 79
| April 6
| New York
| 
| Thaddeus Young (25)
| Elton Brand (9)
| Jrue Holiday (8)
| Wells Fargo Center18,375
| 40–39
|- bgcolor="#ccffcc"
| 80
| April 8
| Toronto
| 
| Elton Brand (22)
| Elton Brand (8)
| Jrue Holiday (11)
| Wells Fargo Center16,362
| 41–39
|- bgcolor="#ffcccc"
| 81
| April 11
| Orlando
| 
| Elton Brand (22)
| Andrés Nocioni (6)
| Jrue Holiday (11)
| Wells Fargo Center19,139
| 41–40
|- bgcolor="#ffcccc"
| 82
| April 13
| Detroit
| 
| Jrue Holiday (21)
| Elton Brand (8)
| Jrue Holiday,Evan Turner (7)
| Wells Fargo Center13,760
| 41–41
|-

Playoffs

Game log

|- bgcolor=ffcccc
| 1
| April 16
| @ Miami
| 
| Thaddeus Young (20)
| Thaddeus Young (11)
| Andre Iguodala (9)
| American Airlines Arena19,600
| 0–1
|- bgcolor=ffcccc
| 2
| April 18
| @ Miami
| 
| Thaddeus Young (18)
| Elton Brand,Andre Iguodala (7)
| Andre Iguodala (7)
| American Airlines Arena20,204
| 0–2
|- bgcolor=ffcccc
| 3
| April 21
| Miami
| 
| Elton Brand (21)
| Elton Brand (10)
| Andre Iguodala (10)
| Wells Fargo Center20,404
| 0–3
|- bgcolor=ccffcc
| 4
| April 24
| Miami
| 
| Evan Turner,Louis Williams (17)
| Elton Brand (11)
| Jrue Holiday (5)
| Wells Fargo Center19,048
| 1–3
|- bgcolor=ffcccc
| 5
| April 27
| @ Miami
| 
| Elton Brand,Andre Iguodala (22)
| Andre Iguodala,Evan Turner (10)
| Jrue Holiday (8)
| American Airlines Arena19,896
| 1–4
|-

Player statistics

Season

|- align="center" bgcolor=""
| Tony Battie || 30 || 0 || 10.1 || .474 || style="background:#002FA7;color:white;"| .667 || .500 || 2.4 || 0.3 || .17 || .43 || 2.7
|- align="center" bgcolor="#f0f0f0"
| Craig Brackins || 2 || 0 || 10.5 || .364 || .000 || .0 || 1.5 || 0.0 || .50 || .0 || 4.0
|- align="center" bgcolor=""
| Elton Brand || 61 || 61 || 34.5 || .521 || .000 || .784 || style="background:#002FA7;color:white;"| 8.6 || 1.4 || 1.13 || style="background:#002FA7;color:white;"| 1.11 || style="background:#002FA7;color:white;"| 15.3
|- align="center" bgcolor="#f0f0f0"
| Spencer Hawes || 61 || 61 || 19.7 || .487 || .280 || .469 || 5.6 || 1.4 || .26 || .85 || 6.7
|- align="center" bgcolor=""
| Jrue Holiday || style="background:#002FA7;color:white;"| 62 || style="background:#002FA7;color:white;"| 62 || 35.1 || .444 || .365 || .792 || 4.0 || style="background:#002FA7;color:white;"| 6.3 || 1.50 || .39 || 13.8
|- align="center" bgcolor="#f0f0f0"
| Andre Iguodala || 50 || 50 || style="background:#002FA7;color:white;"| 37.1 || .446 || .321 || .712 || 6.1 || style="background:#002FA7;color:white;"| 6.3 || style="background:#002FA7;color:white;"| 1.58 || .56 || 14.3
|- align="center" bgcolor=""
| Jason Kapono || 18 || 2 || 4.9 || .273 || .250 || .500 || 0.4 || 0.1 || .11 || .06 || 0.8
|- align="center" bgcolor="#f0f0f0"
| Jodie Meeks || 54 || 44 || 25.3 || .406 || .404 || style="background:#002FA7;color:white;"| .903 || 1.8 || 1.0 || .69 || .06 || 9.7
|- align="center" bgcolor=""
| Andrés Nocioni || 40 || 16 || 18.6 || .425 || .337 || .804 || 3.5 || 0.9 || .33 || .33 || 6.5
|- align="center" bgcolor="#f0f0f0"
| Darius Songaila || 10 || 0 || 7.1 || .467 || .0 || .500 || 1.0 || 0.2 || .0 || .0 || 1.6
|- align="center" bgcolor=""
| Marreese Speights || 51 || 1 || 12.0 || .513 || .250 || .754 || 3.5 || 0.5 || .12 || .27 || 5.6
|- align="center" bgcolor="#f0f0f0"
| Evan Turner || 60 || 12 || 24.3 || .428 || .256 || .804 || 4.3 || 2.1 || .63 || .18 || 7.5
|- align="center" bgcolor=""
| Louis Williams || 60 || 0 || 23.5 || .401 || .342 || .833 || 1.9 || 3.3 || .55 || .28 || 13.6
|- align="center" bgcolor="#f0f0f0"
| Thaddeus Young || style="background:#002FA7;color:white;"| 62 || 1 || 26.2 || style="background:#002FA7;color:white;"| .554 || .222 || .717 || 5.2 || 1.1 || 1.08 || .32 || 12.6
|}

Playoffs

Awards and records

Awards
 Andre Iguodala, NBA All-Defensive Second Team

Records

Transactions

Trades

Free agents

Additions

Subtractions

References

Philadelphia
Philadelphia 76ers seasons
Philadelphia
Philadelphia